The Mount Stony Brook Observatory is an astronomical observatory operated by Stony Brook University in Stony Brook, New York. It is located on the roof of the Earth and Space Sciences Building. The dome contains a Meade 14" Maksutov–Cassegrain telescope and SBIG (SBIG-STL1001e) imaging equipment. The telescope is used for teaching undergraduate and graduate astronomy labs by the department, as well as by the Astronomy club. The observatory's imaging capabilities have been used to monitor variable stars. On the first Friday of every month during the school year the department hosts "Astronomy Open Nights" during which a lecture is given, followed by observing if the weather permits. The observatory was built in 1968 and Astronomy Open Nights have been held there since 1976. The current telescope was installed in 1981.

See also
 List of observatories

References

External links
Observatory Website
Stony Brook Undergraduate Astronomy Club

Astronomical observatories in New York (state)
Stony Brook University
University and college buildings completed in 1968